Kid Down is a Swedish Pop punk band formed in Åmål in 2002.

Biography 
Kid Down was signed to Burning Heart Records and released their two first albums called The Noble Art Of Irony (2007), I Want My Girlfriend Rich (2008). In 2010 an album called Murphy's Law was released online by the band.
After "Murphy's Law" was released the band went on a hiatus.

In 2007 the band won the Rockbjörnen Music Award (MySpace-Award).

The band toured through Europe with Fall Out Boy to promote their second album. The band won at the Swedish Metal Awards in Category Best Punk/Hardcore album.

In April 2009 Kid Down toured through Europe and played on Groezrock with Rise Against and Bullet for My Valentine. The band shared stage with Emery, MxPx.

The band currently exist out of Eric Höjdén (Vocals, Guitar), Jens Anundson (Guitar, Vocals), Kristoffer Ljung (Bass guitar, Vocals) and David Bergström (Drums). Höjdén is record producer at Dead End Studios and also co-founder of Panic & Action, an indie record label and management together with Peter Ahlqvist. Höjden produced albums by Adept and Her Bright Skies.

Discography

Albums 
 2007: The Noble Art Of Irony (Burning Heart Records)
 2008:  I Want My Girlfriend Rich (Burning Heart Records)
 2010: Murphy's Law (Kid Down Records)

EPs 
 2003: We'll Make It Away (Dead Frog Records/Kid Down Records)
 2005: Deadkidsongs (Atenzia Records)
 2008: Red Lights (Download-EP; Epitaph Records)

External links 
 Official Homepage

Notes 

Swedish punk rock groups
Burning Heart Records artists
Atenzia Records artists